Yakka or yacka may refer to:

 Yacka, South Australia, a settlement in South Australia
 Yakka, common name for the grasstree Xanthorrhoea in South Australia
 Yakka people (Lanka), a historic/mythical group of Sri Lanka
 Yakka, a type of spirits worshipped by the Vedda people of Sri Lanka
 Yakkha people, an ethic group of Nepal and northern India
 Yakkha language, a Sino-Tibetan language
 Yakka Banovic (born 1956), Bosnian footballer

See also 
 Hard yakka, a term meaning "hard work" in Australian English and New Zealand English
 Hard Yakka, an Australian clothing company named after the term 
 A Lot of Hard Yakka, autobiography by English cricketer journalist Simon Hughes
 Yaca (disambiguation)
 Yacca (disambiguation)
 Yacker, a creature in the video game Sonic Colors
 Yaka (disambiguation)
 Yakkha (disambiguation)

Language and nationality disambiguation pages